Dancing Star is a 2009 Sri Lankan Sinhala drama film directed by Susara Dinal and produced by Sirasa Movies for MTV Network (Pvt) Ltd. It stars popular singer Dushyanth Weeraman and newcomer Shiroshi Romeshika in lead roles along with Sanath Gunathilake and Nilanthi Dias. Music composed by Bathiya and Santhush. It is the 1120th Sri Lankan film in the Sinhala cinema.

Plot

Cast
The film leads with two newcomers to the cinema industry.
 Dushyanth Weeraman
 Shiroshi Romeshika as Shiroshi
 Sanath Gunathilake as Ramanayake
 Nilanthi Dias
 Hashini Gonagala
 Sarath Kothalawala
 Roshan Ranawana as Sudesh
 Ravindra Randeniya as Greshan
 Kumara Thirimadura
 Rosy Senanayake
 Lakshman Mendis
 Vishaka Siriwardana
 Nirosha Perera as Nirosha
 Malini Fonseka - herself, cameo appearance
 Sabeetha Perera - herself, cameo appearance

Soundtrack

References

2009 films
2000s Sinhala-language films
2009 drama films
Sri Lankan drama films